The Volksbank Neckartal eG is a German cooperative bank headquartered in Eberbach.

History
In 1865 a small circle of liberal thinking Eberbacher citizens who were connected to the idea of self-help founded the Vorschussverein Eberbach (advance association) based on the model of the co-operative founding fathers Friedrich Wilhelm Raiffeisen and Franz Hermann Schulze-Delitzsch. Three years later, the Vorschussverein Neckargemünd was founded. Both advance associations are predecessor institutions of today's Volksbank Neckartal.

In 2001, Volksbank Eberbach-Hessisches Neckartal merged with Volksbank Neckargemünd-Meckesheim, which emerged from the merger of Volksbank Neckargemünd and Volksbank Meckesheim in 1998, to form Volksbank Neckartal. In 2009, the merger took place between Volksbank Neckartal and Volksbank Schwarzbachtal.

Structure

Volksbank Neckartal eG has 34 offices in its business area and has 373 employees. With 46,015 members, Volksbank Neckartal eG is the largest association of individuals in the region. Via the Representatives' Meeting and Supervisory Board these members, in accordance with the Cooperatives Act and the Articles of Association, determine the bank's business policy. In addition to the bank's own products and services, the Volksbank Neckartal eG also offers services from the cooperative financial group (Bausparkasse Schwäbisch Hall, R+V Versicherung, Union Investment, DZ Bank, VR Leasing and the cooperative mortgage banks).

Main offices are in:

 Eberbach
 Helmstadt
 Meckenheim
 Neckargemünd
 Waibstadt

Business offices are located in:

 Aglasterhausen
 Bammental
 Dilsberg
 Eberbach-Nord
 Epfenbach
 Eschelbronn
 Gaiberg
 Gauangelloch
 Hirschhorn
 Lobenfeld
 Wall
 Mückenloch
 Münzenbach
 Neckarbischofsheim
 Neckargerach
 Neckarsteinach
 Neunkirchen
 Reichartshausen
 Schönau
 Schönbrunn
 Spechbach
 Strümpfelbrunn
 Waldwimmersbach
 Wiesenbach
 Zuzenhausen
 Self-Service Neidenstein
 Self-Service Eberbach Neuer Markt
 Self-Service Mönchzell
 Self-Service Oberdielbach

References

External links
 Official Website

Banks of Germany
Cooperative banks of Germany
Corporate finance
Banks established in 1865
German companies established in 1865